The 1984 Australia rugby union tour of Britain and Ireland was a series of eighteen matches played by the Australia national rugby union team (the Wallabies) in Britain and Ireland between 17 October and 15 December 1984. The Australian team won thirteen matches, drew one and lost four but notably won all four of their international matches.

The 1984 Wallabies were the first and only Australian side to achieve a Grand Slam doing so in four Tests against the Home Nations. This feat had been achieved five times previously, by the 1978 New Zealand All Blacks and by the South African Springboks during their tours of 1912–13, 1931–32, 1951–52 and 1960–61. Australia's classy five-eighth Mark Ella managed to score a try in every Test. The tour confirmed Australia's coming of age as a world-class rugby nation, marking the end of three difficult decades of inconsistent international performances from 1950 onwards.

The squad's leadership
Alan Jones was widely experienced as a schoolboy coach but had had only one season coaching first-grade before his rise to the national position. He steered Manly to a surprise victory in the 1983 Sydney 1st Grade Premiership over the strong Randwick club. He was practically unknown in Australian rugby at point but set his sights on the national representative coaching job at a time when the incumbent Bob Dwyer was becoming increasingly vulnerable. Under Dwyer in 1983 the Wallabies lost a two Test series against the French, tipping Dwyer's career record to the negative with six losses, five wins and a draw. Jones publicly announced his intentions to stand against Dwyer in early 1984 and ran a media campaign that befitted his experience as a former Prime Ministerial speech writer. In February 1984 he was installed as the national coach and he set out from that point to select, train, guide and strategise Australian rugby to the summit of international success.

After failing to wrestle the Bledisloe Cup away from the All Blacks in mid-1984 (a 1–2 series loss), Jones set his sights on glory from the British Isles tour and the specific goal of winning all four of the Test matches and to eclipse the one win, three loss record of the 1981–82 Wallabies. To assist he called upon his friend, the affable Queenslander Alec Evans, who had coached rugby union at Brisbane Grammar School whilst Jones was a teacher  and was a man of enormous rugby experience and knowledge. Evans became the first Assistant-Coach in the history of Wallaby tours. Tour Manager was former Wallaby Captain Charles "Chilla" Wilson who managed in the style of a "benevolent, big brother". Howell quotes Mark Ella "I couldn't think of a better manager. I played for Australia for six years. Thank God I had Chilla Wilson for three of them. With Jonesy up there dominating everything, Chilla was the perfect foil. He was quiet, unobtrusive and didn't make a lot of noise. In fact, you wouldn't know Chilla was the manager until the time came for somebody to get up and say the right thing"

Mark Ella had captained Australia in ten Tests prior to 1984, including the eleven match 1983 Australia rugby union tour of Italy and France. However Jones had resolved that whichever side won the 1984 interstate series would provide the captain and so Andrew Slack took up the tour captaincy Howell reports that he was a popular captain, a calm organiser both on and off the field. Quiet thoughtful and intelligent but also able to pull out his guitar and bring everyone together with a few songs. Ella is also quoted "Slacky was probably the only person who could have handled the captaincy in the British Isles. Every team needs a cornerstone and Slacky was it. We all had lots of respect for him....[on-field] his role was to settle the play down, be the link man. Not be happy-go-lucky or adventurous. Slack did it to perfection and always seemed to be there when he was wanted."Jones also made a thoughtful choice in appointing his Manly club charge Steve Williams as vice-captain drawing on his front-foot leadership and strength as an enforcer. Ella is quoted again "When Alan Jones made Steve the senior forward, it was the best thing that could have happened. He took the responsibility and really drove the forwards. [With his] sensational jumping ....our line-out was complete"

Tour itinerary
By 1984 the nine-month-long Wallaby tours of Britain, France and North America were a thing of the past. Quick and cheap air-travel meant that a Test tour of the four Home Nations could be completed in two months but with only eighteen matches played instead of the thirty of earlier years. Varsity teams were no longer part of the schedule which favoured quality City or regional representative sides for the mid-week fixtures. The traditions of a game against Combined Services and a final tour match against the Barbarians were continued.

Tradition was also maintained with a visit by the touring party to Buckingham Palace to meet The Queen. During the audience Wallaby breakaway Chris Roche leant on an antique table which broke and crashed to the ground. Nick Farr-Jones related that Her Majesty put the visitors at ease with a laugh and a resumption of conversation.

Matches of the Tour
Scores and results list Australia's points tally first.

The match against Swansea was abandoned after 60 minutes due to floodlight failure.

Test matches

England

By half-time the score was 3–0 to Australia from a Michael Lynagh penalty goal but soon after the break came the first try of the match. Twenty-five metres from the English line, Ella received the ball from the scrum base and began to drift across the field with the ball in hand. Lynagh, Gould and David Campese all ran decoys off Ella at varying angles and the English defence were indecisive. Ella himself then changed pace and slid through the tiniest of openings for a try under the posts. Lynagh converted and later scored a try himself.
The final try was a brilliant team effort. Farr-Jones had received the ball from the line-out and passed to Gould who threw a long wayward pass which Ella salvaged in safe hands while running and leaning forward at the same time. Finding the English defence lacking in numbers, Ella passed to Campese who took off to out-sprint English winger Rory Underwood. Ella was in support but marked by English debutant Stuart Barnes. Running out of space and about to be bundled into touch, Campese lofted a pass to Simon Poidevin, who scored the final try.

AUSTRALIA: Roger Gould, David Campese, Andrew Slack (c), Michael Lynagh, Brendan Moon, Mark Ella, Nick Farr-Jones, Topo Rodriguez, Tom Lawton Jnr, Andy McIntyre, Steve Williams, Steve Cutler, Simon Poidevin, Steve Tuynman, David Codey. Res: Matt Burke, Mark McBain, Stan Pilecki, Ross Reynolds, Philip Cox, James Black 

ENGLAND: Nick Stringer, John Carleton, Rob Lozowski, Bryan Barley, Rory Underwood, Stuart Barnes, Nigel Melville (c), Gareth Chilcott, Steve Mills (rep Steve Brain 30 mins), Gary Pearce, Jim Syddall, Nigel Redman, Jon Hall, Chris Butcher, Gary Rees. Res: Rob Andrew, Huw Davies, Richard Hill, Paul Simpson, Bob Hesford.

Ireland

Lynagh's dropped goal was only the score in the first half and a second dropped goal, this time by Ella, put Australia 6–0 up shortly after half-time. Kiernan hit back with three successive penalties to give Ireland a 6–9 lead with seventeen minutes to go. Ella's second dropped goal of the game equalised at 9–9 and late in the game Ella delivered a try, appearing inside Campese to score after an Australian move and put Australia 13–9 ahead. Lynagh's penalty completed the scoring and Australia won 16–9.Rothmans p36

IRELAND: Hugo MacNeill, Trevor Ringland, Brendan Mullin, Moss Finn, Mike Kiernan, Paul Dean, Michael Bradley, Phil Orr, Ciaran Fitzgerald (c), J. J. McCoy, Donal Lenihan, Willie Anderson, Phillip Matthews, Ronan Kearney, William Sexton. Res: Mick Fitzpatrick, Harry Harbison, Brian McCall, Rab Brady, Tony Ward, John Murphy 

AUSTRALIA: Roger Gould, David Campese, Andrew Slack (c), Michael Lynagh, Matt Burke, Mark Ella, Nick Farr-Jones, Topo Rodriguez, Tom Lawton Jnr, Andy McIntyre, Steve Williams, Steve Cutler, Simon Poidevin, Steve Tuynman, Chris Roche. Res: David Codey, Stan Pilecki, Ross Reynolds, Philip Cox, James Black, Michael Hawker  

Wales

The Test match venue was a wet and muddy Cardiff Arms, with the game played close among the forwards. Lawton's first try was scored within seven minutes resulting from a rehearsed move practised many times in training. Cutler won the jump in a short line-out, Poidevin set up the maul and Nick Farr-Jones made a blind-side run, putting Gould through a gap who passed to Peter Grigg. When Grigg was cornered he tossed a pass infield to Lawton who plunged over for the try.

Lyngah made it 13–0 when he scored between the posts after Farr-Jones again escaped up the short side from a scrum to set up a dazzling break by Campese. Poidevin, as ever was trailing Campo on the inside and took a pass then put Lynagh in for the try.

Halfway through the second-half a Wallaby scrum was set five metres out from the Welsh line. The Wallaby call "Samson" was made for an eight-man pushover and the Australian pack driven by its giant locks Williams and Steve Cutler set out to humiliate the Welsh eight and shove them back over the try line. The ground was taken and with the ball secure at the feet of the Wallaby second-row, Steve Tunyman fell onto it for a try and a 19–3 lead. Gould converted, then kicked a penalty goal.

However, Wales was not finished. Following a line-out close to the Australian line, Welsh halfback David Bishop leapt acrobatically to score a try, the only try scored against the Australians during the four grandslam tests. The rumour in Australia at the time was that David Bishop had been released from gaol in the previous week, to play in this match. Subsequently, Australia 'ran away' with it when Ella scored a final intercept try, to take the final score to 28–9.

AUSTRALIA: Roger Gould, David Campese, Andrew Slack (c), Michael Lynagh, Peter Grigg, Mark Ella, Nick Farr-Jones, Topo Rodriguez, Tom Lawton Jnr, Andy McIntyre, Steve Williams, Steve Cutler, Simon Poidevin, Steve Tuynman, David Codey. Res: Mark McBain, Stan Pilecki, Ross Reynolds, Philip Cox, James Black, Matt Burke 

WALES: Mark Wyatt, Mark Titley, Rob Ackerman, Mark Ring, Phil Lewis, Malcolm Dacey, David Bishop, Ian Stephens (rep Jeff Whitefoot 27 mins), Mike Watkins (c), Ian Eidman, John Perkins, Bob Norster, Alun Davies, Eddie Butler, Dai Pickering. Res: Gwyn Evans, Gareth Davies, Ray Giles, Billy James, Gareth Roberts 

Scotland

The prodigiously talent Ella starred in the fourth test of the tour. He threw a cut-out pass fifteen minutes into the match which led to Campese's first try and then in the second-half he executed a run-around with Roger Gould which got him over the line for his fourth try in as many matches. With fifteen minutes to go from a planned move off a two-man line-out Farr-Jones darted into the line-out to take the ball, scurry down the touchline and score in the corner.

AUSTRALIA: Roger Gould, David Campese, Andrew Slack (c), Michael Lynagh, Peter Grigg, Mark Ella, Nick Farr-Jones, Topo Rodriguez, Tom Lawton Jnr, Andy McIntyre, Steve Williams, Steve Cutler, Simon Poidevin, Steve Tuynman, David Codey. Res: Mark McBain, Stan Pilecki, Ross Reynolds, Philip Cox, James Black, Timothy Lane 

SCOTLAND: Peter Dods, Peter Steven, Alexander Kennedy, Keith Robertson, Roger Baird, Douglas Wyllie, Roy Laidlaw (c), Alexander MacKenzie, Colin Deans, Iain Milne, Bill Cuthbertson, Alan Tomes, Jim Calder, John Beattie John Jeffrey. Res: Gerry McGuinness, Gary Callander, Tom Smith, Gordon Hunter, Andrew Ker, Jim Renwick

Touring party
Coach : Alan Jones
Assistant coach: Alec Evans
Tour Manager: Chilla Wilson
Captain: Andrew Slack
Vice-captain : Steve Williams

Squad
Tour appearances include''' appearances as a replacement, which are shown in brackets e.g. (1R)

References

Sources
 Collection (1995) Gordon Bray presents The Spirit of Rugby, Harper Collins Publishers Sydney
 Howell, Max (2005) Born to Lead – Wallaby Test Captains, Celebrity Books, Auckland NZ
 FitzSimons, Peter (1993) Nick Farr-Jones, The Authorised Biography Random House Sydney
 Ella, Mark & Smith, Terry (1987) Path to Victory: Wallaby Power in the 1980s ABC Books Sydney
 Prenter, Geoff (editor) (1997) The Greatest Games We Ever Played, Ironbark Press, Sydney – this essay Smith, Terry Australia v Wales 1984''

1984 rugby union tours
1984
1984
1984
1984
1984
1984–85 in European rugby union
1984–85 in Irish rugby union
1984–85 in English rugby union
1984–85 in Welsh rugby union
1984–85 in Scottish rugby union
1984 in Australian rugby union